Frank Farina OAM (born 5 September 1964) is an Australian football (soccer) coach and former player who played as a forward.

His playing career spanned Australia, Belgium, France, Italy and England, and was a major player for the Australian National Team in the late 1980s and 1990s, as well as managing the national team in the early 2000s. He was the first Indigenous Australian to manage the national team.  he is a member of the inaugural National Indigenous Advisory Group of Football Australia.

Club career
Born in Darwin, Northern Territory, Farina spent part of his childhood in Papua New Guinea and grew up in Cairns, north Queensland and went to school at St Augustine's College. While in Cairns, he played youth soccer with Stratford United and Edge Hill United FC. He won a prestigious position and scholarship at the Australian Institute of Sport (AIS) in 1982 and played in the National Soccer League for the Canberra Arrows the following year.

National Soccer League
When he was 16, one of his school teachers suggested he try out for Mareeba United of the semi-professional Queensland State League, with whom he played four games towards the end of the season, which was his first paid soccer experience.

Farina's early playing career was spent in Australia, playing the National Soccer League. He played for the Canberra Arrows, Sydney City and Marconi-Fairfield.

His early seasons were solid, scoring just under 10 goals a season for Canberra in the 1983 and 1984 season. He earned the Most Entertaining Player award for the National Soccer League from SBS-TV in 1984. He made his full international debut as a substitute in Australia's 2–3 loss in China in 1984. Farina moved to Sydney City in 1985, and that season City made the 1985 NSL Grand Final, losing 2–0 over two legs to Brunswick, as well as winning the 1986 National Cup.

With the demise of Sydney City a few weeks into the 1987 season when owner Frank Lowy pulled out of funding the team, Farina moved to Marconi Fairfield for 1987 and 1988. His form flourished, scoring 16 and 17 goals respectively. In both years he won the Golden Boot Award, the Players' Player Medal (equivalent of Johnny Warren Medal) and, in 1988, the Most Entertaining Player award again from SBS-TV and the 1988 Oceania Player of the Year awards. He cemented his place in the Australian national team, the Socceroos, until his retirement from international competition in 1995, as well as attracting overseas interest.

Europe
This interest led to him leaving Australia, for Belgium, and Club Brugge in the latter half of 1988. His finishing ability was well regarded, and he played over 70 games for Brugge, scoring 43 goals and playing a major role in the club winning the Belgian First Division title in 1989/90 as well as the Belgian Cup in 1990/91 and Belgian Supercup in 1990 and 1991. Farina won the Belgian Golden Boot and Best Foreign Player awards in Club Brugge's successful 1989/90 season.

Farina subsequently transferred to Bari in Italy in 1991/1992, where he became the first Australian to play in Serie A on a then record transfer fee for an Australian player of more than AUD$3m. However, with a change of coach nine games into the season and not in the same scoring form, he was considered one foreigner too many and dropped from the squad. He had a brief loan period at Notts County in England in 1991/1992 until another change of manager, and transferred to RC Strasbourg in France in 1992/1993 where he had 2 solid seasons in French First Division, scoring 8 goals from 24 appearances in 1992/1993, then 6 goals from 23 appearances in 1993/1994. His final season playing in Europe was for Lille OSC who finished 14th in the French First Division, Farina scoring 6 Goals from 27 appearances.

Managerial career

Brisbane Strikers
Farina's return to Australia was with the Brisbane Strikers, for the 1995/1996 Season, scoring 20 goals from 20 matches, coming 2nd in the Golden Boot awards behind Damien Mori (31 Goals). Brisbane finished 5th in 1995/96. In 1996/1997, the Strikers needed a new Coach, and Farina stepped up to the position as the new Player/Coach. Farina led the Strikers to their first ever NSL title that year, as they defeated Sydney United 2–0 (with Farina scoring their first goal) in the Grand Final at Lang Park in front of a then capacity crowd of a little over 40,000 fans. He was named the Coach of the Year in 1997.

The Strikers could not back their title win however, crashing to 3rd last in the 1997/1998 season. Farina only managed a solitary goal in 18 appearances, with long-term injury and age (34) getting the better of him. He left the Strikers, and joined Marconi as a player/coach for a final season, with coaching being dominant, Farina only made 2 appearances for the Stallions, without scoring. However, he did coach the team to the Minor-Semi final place, eliminating the Northern Spirit, then losing 0–1 away to Perth Glory in the minor semi-final. He retired from playing that year.

Australia
Farina was appointed the Australian National Coach in 1999, becoming the first Indigenous Australian to manage the Australian National Team. He was chosen over many candidates including the then current caretaker coach Raul Blanco (who had replaced Terry Venables). His first match was a 0–2 Loss against a second string Brazilian team in Sydney, followed by a 2–2 draw with Brazil in Melbourne 3 days later.

The team under Farina won its first match in February 2000, with the majority of the European-based players in the side, they defeated Hungary 3–0 in Budapest.

2000 OFC Nations Cup
In 2000 Australia played in, and won, the Oceania Nations Cup, and subsequently qualified for the 2001 FIFA Confederations Cup.

2001 FIFA Confederations Cup

Australia impressed at the 2001 Confederations Cup, qualifying as runners up from Group A on goal difference thanks largely to a memorable 1–0 win over reigning world champions France, before eventually triumphing by the same scoreline in the 3rd place playoff vs Brazil.

2002 FIFA World Cup qualification
In 2001, Australia began its quest to qualify for the World Cup for a 2nd time, and Farina led the team to huge victories over Tonga (22–0), and a record-breaking 31–0 win against American Samoa, Archie Thompson breaking the record for most goals in a single international with 13. Australia defeated Tonga 2–0 to win their group, then New Zealand 6–1 on Aggregate to Qualify for a World Cup Playoff against Uruguay.

In between these matches, Australia defeated Mexico and France during the Confederation Cup group stage, then defeated Brazil 1–0 win claim 3rd Place. These results strengthened belief that the team would make the World Cup Finals, but Australia failed again at the final World Cup hurdle, losing 3–1 on Aggregate (1–0 in Australia, 0–3 in Uruguay), which meant the 1974 Australian team remained the only team to qualify for the World Cup finals.

2002 OFC Nations Cup
2002 was a dour year, with only the Oceanian nations cup taking place, Australia sending a team composed of Australian-based players to New Zealand. After comfortable early stages, Australia needed a Golden Goal to defeat Tonga in the semi-final, then losing 1–0 to New Zealand in the Final. The only game of note in 2003 was a 1–3 win against England in a friendly. In 2004, Australia progressed safely through the World Cup Oceania qualifiers.

2005 FIFA Confederations Cup
2005 was Farina's final year as coach, his failure to win a single game in the Confederations Cup signalling the end of his reign. Farina became the subject of intense media pressure, as his team were criticised for not showing tactical awareness and cohesion expected of players of their quality. Farina became agitated with SBS football correspondents, accusing them of running a witch-hunt against him.

In 2005, after an unconvincing 2–1 win over Iraq during a friendly, Farina was involved in an incident with SBS reporter Andrew Orsatti in an informal post-match interview conducted in a corridor outside the dressing room. After a series of curt three/four worded answers to a series of questions shown on air, it was alleged by both parties that the other instigated a fracas. Eyewitnesses said that Farina grabbed Orsatti by the throat and tried to punch him. Orsatti later dropped assault charges against Farina. It was reported that Farina was upset at suggestions by the FFA that he attend anger management classes. Leading SBS commentator Les Murray said that Farina simply interpreted any criticism of his professional work as a coach to be a personal slight.

Departure
Farina departed by 'mutual consent' on 29 June 2005 after his team lost all three games at the 2005 Confederations Cup. He cited a loss in confidence on the part of the FFA chairman Frank Lowy and CEO John O'Neill. He was replaced by the Dutchman Guus Hiddink, who led Australia to a successful 2006 World Cup qualification campaign, defeating Uruguay (penalties after a 1–1 aggregate).

After his departure from the national team Farina was employed as a newspaper columnist and often conducted interviews about Australian football on talkback radio stations. He was also a radio commentator for the World Cup qualification matches against Uruguay.

Queensland/Brisbane Roar FC
On 15 November 2006 Farina was appointed head coach of Brisbane Roar FC after the departure of Miron Bleiberg. He is credited for his support of young Australian footballers, having recruited Michael Zullo and Tahj Minniecon, who were catalysts for much of Queensland's success in the 2007–2008 season.

On 11 October 2009, Farina was suspended indefinitely by the club over a drink-driving charge. He was on his way to training when he was caught. Farina was officially sacked on 14 October 2009. He was given a three-month severance package as part of the sacking.

Papua New Guinea
On 12 February 2011 it was confirmed that he had signed a contract with Papua New Guinea.

Sydney FC

On 28 November 2012, Farina was appointed head coach of Sydney FC, replacing  Ian Crook who resigned and caretaker coach Steve Corica. Frank's spell in charge hasn't been without controversy, with his Sydney team noted for their inconsistency and criticised in some quarters for their unattractive style of play. Ongoing dissatisfaction at his management (along with the performance of the boardroom) from Sydney's core supporter group 'The Cove' culminated in protests with banners and chanting calling for his dismissal at their home game against Adelaide United on 8 February 2014. This was followed by an unprecedented walkout in protest at the ejection of one of their core members for their involvement in the banner, contrary to media reports claiming it was pre-meditated, and on 23 April 2014, Farina was sacked from Sydney FC.

Fiji
Following his sacking from Sydney FC, Farina sported contract offers from clubs in New Zealand, however signed as the technical adviser for the Fiji U-20s in the lead up to the 2015 FIFA U-20 World Cup. In January 2015 it was announced that Farina was to take over the full coaching role of the U-20s, in the lead up to the 2015 FIFA U-20 World Cup in New Zealand.

In October 2015, Farina was confirmed to take over from Juan Carlos Buzzetti as head coach of Fiji seniors in December. He was subsequently sacked from both the national team and the U-23 team following Fiji's performance at the 2016 Summer Olympics in Brazil.

Other roles
In November 2021 Farina was appointed to the inaugural National Indigenous Advisory Group of Football Australia. The group aims at supporting and increasing Indigenous participation in the game.

Personal life
Farina is of Italian and Torres Strait Islander descent, and is the uncle of footballer Zenon Caravella. He is married with two children. In 1998, he published his autobiography My World Is Round: A Personal Playing History (ghost written by Bonita Mersiades). In 2000 Farina was awarded a Medal of the Order of Australia for "service to soccer as a player and coach". In October 2009 Farina was interviewed by Monica Attard on ABC Radio's Sunday Profile where he discussed the drink driving charge and his dismissal and their effect on his family. Farina is the namesake of the Frank Farina Cup, which is contested between National Premier Leagues Queensland teams Northern Fury FC and Far North Queensland FC, with the trophy named in recognition of Farina's North Queensland origins, and his achievements as a player. Frank Farina’s son Jordan Farina is also a footballer who plays in the National Premier Leagues Queensland for Queensland Lions FC as an attacker.

Honours

Player
Club Brugge
 Belgian League Championship: 1989–1990
 Belgian Cup: 1990–1991
 Belgian Supercup: 1990, 1991

Brisbane Strikers
  NSL Championship: 1996–1997

Marconi Fairfield
 NSL Championship: 1988

Sydney City
 NSL Cup: 1986

Personal honours
 FFA Hall of Champions Inductee – 2001
 Oceania Footballer of the Year: 1988
 Belgian League Top Scorer: 1989–1990
 NSL Player of the Year: 1987 with Marconi Fairfield
 NSL Player of the Year: 1988 with Marconi Fairfield
 NSL Top Scorer: 1987 with Marconi Fairfield – 16 goals
 NSL Top Scorer: 1988 with Marconi Fairfield – 16 goals

Manager
Australia
 OFC Nations Cup: 2000, 2004
With Brisbane Strikers:
 NSL Championship: 1996–1997

International goals

Managerial statistics

References

External links
 
 
 Queensland Roar profile
 FFA – Hall of Fame profile
 Oz Football profile
 Sunday Profile interview

1964 births
Living people
Sportspeople from Darwin, Northern Territory
Australian people of Italian descent
Association football forwards
Australian soccer players
Australian expatriate soccer players
Australia international soccer players
Australia B international soccer players
Olympic soccer players of Australia
Footballers at the 1988 Summer Olympics
Canberra City FC players
Marconi Stallions FC players
Club Brugge KV players
Notts County F.C. players
S.S.C. Bari players
RC Strasbourg Alsace players
Lille OSC players
Expatriate footballers in France
Expatriate footballers in Belgium
Expatriate footballers in Italy
Expatriate footballers in England
Brisbane Strikers FC players
Australian soccer coaches
Australian expatriate soccer coaches
Australia national soccer team managers
2001 FIFA Confederations Cup managers
2005 FIFA Confederations Cup managers
Brisbane Roar FC managers
Sydney FC managers
Marconi Stallions FC managers
Belgian Pro League players
Serie A players
Ligue 1 players
National Soccer League (Australia) players
Australian Institute of Sport soccer players
Recipients of the Medal of the Order of Australia
A-League Men managers
Papua New Guinea national football team managers
Expatriate football managers in Papua New Guinea
Fiji national football team managers
Expatriate football managers in Fiji
Indigenous Australian soccer players
Brisbane Strikers coaches
Australian expatriate sportspeople in Fiji
Australian expatriate sportspeople in Papua New Guinea
Australian expatriate sportspeople in Belgium
Australian expatriate sportspeople in Italy
Australian expatriate sportspeople in France
Australian expatriate sportspeople in England